Diptychophora minimalis is a moth in the family Crambidae. It was described by George Hampson in 1919. It is found in Sierra Leone.

References

Diptychophorini
Moths described in 1919